

Austria
Austrian Netherlands – Prince Charles Alexander of Lorraine, Governor of the Austrian Netherlands (1744–1780)

Denmark
Danish West Indies – 
Frederik Moth, Governor-General (1770–1772)
Ulrich Wilhelm von Roepstorff, Governor-General (1772–1773)

Great Britain
Jamaica – Sir William Trelawny, Governor of Jamaica (1767–1772)
Province of Massachusetts Bay – Thomas Hutchinson, Governor of the Province of Massachusetts Bay (1769–1774)
Province of New Jersey – William Franklin, Governor of New Jersey (1763–1776)
Province of Virginia -

Portugal
 Angola – 
 Francisco Inocéncio de Sousa Coutinho, Governor of Angola (1764–1772)
 António de Lencastre, Governor of Angola (1772–1779)
 Macau – Diogo Fernandes Salema e Saldanha, Governor of Macau (1771–1777)

Spain
New Spain – Antonio María de Bucareli y Ursúa, Viceroy of New Spain (1771–1779)

Colonial governors
Colonial governors
1772